Korkinskoye is the name of several rural localities in Russia:
Korkinskoye, Sverdlovsk Oblast, a selo in Turinsky District of Sverdlovsk Oblast
Korkinskoye, Vologda Oblast, a village in Kubinsky Selsoviet of Kharovsky District of Vologda Oblast